Djamaa el Djedid (الجامع الجديد), also rendered Djamaa al-Djedid, or Jamaa El Jedid (meaning New Mosque) is a mosque in Algiers, the capital of Algeria. It is dated to 1660/1070 AH by an inscription over its main entrance portal. That inscription also attributes its construction to al-Hajj Habib, a Janissary governor of the Algiers region appointed by the Ottoman imperial administration in Istanbul During the French colonial rule, the mosque was called the Mosquée de la Pêcherie and in English the Mosque of the Fisherman's Wharf (Mesdjed el-Haoutin).

Architecture 
The central dome reaches a height of 24 meters and rests on four pillars via a drum and four pendentives. These four corners are enclosed by four octagonal cupolas. Of the areas between these square spaces, barrel vaults cover three of the sides whilst the fourth area, facing the qibla wall, is covered by a fourth vault that has three bays and is flanked on both sides by two aisles.

Djamaa el Djedid Ottoman patronage directs the structure in terms of both the plan and the decoration. The building is unique in its mixture of multiple architectural traditions, including elements from Andalusian and Southern Italian religious architecture that were influential in Algeria at the time. The confusion of architectural traditions is also visible in the mosque's interior design, where carvings reveal Italian influences while the mihrab's arch follows Andalusian models. The use of Italian marble instead of wood for the minbar reflects Ottoman traditions, though the components are all typical of North African minbars.

The Mosque forms the eastern edge of the Place des Martyrs, the qibla wall serves the busy Amilcar Cabral Boulevard, and the Almoravid Great Mosque of Algiers (Built c.1097BC) also giving on the same Boulevard, sits seventy meters to the east of Djamaa el Djedid. The mosque got its informal name from its proximity to the fishing harbour, and that it was most frequented by the local fishermen. The mosque measures 27 meters wide and 48 meters long with the qibla wall forming the southern edge of the building.

The stone structure of the Mosque is completely whitewashed on its exterior, including the domes, resulting in a white, unified appearance. One of the only hints of colour on the exterior is the thin line of tile trimming the decorative rampart on the mosque's walls facing the Place des Martyrs. Though most of the mosque reveals a clear Ottoman influence, the minaret is based almost entirely on traditional North African square models. Initially 30 meters high, today it's only 25 meters above the level of the street, due to the gradually rising street level. The clock, that was integrated into the minaret by French architect Bournichon, was originally part of the Palais Jenina.

Notable Imams
 Mohamed Charef (1908-2011)

See also
 Algerian Islamic reference
 Hizb Rateb (Hezzab, Bash Hezzab, Salka)
 Ketchaoua Mosque
 Ottoman Algeria
 Islam in Algeria
 List of cultural assets of Algeria
 Lists of mosques
 List of mosques in Africa

References

Mosques in Algiers
Religious buildings and structures completed in 1660
17th-century mosques
Ottoman Mosques in Algeria